The fourth running of the Women's Tour of California (officially:  Amgen Tour of California Women's Race empowered with SRAM) was held from 17 to 19 May 2018. American Katie Hall won the race. Tayler Wiles was second, Kasia Niewiadoma third.

It was the 11th race of the 2018 UCI Women's World Tour. Raced over three stages, it covered a total distance of 301.5 km. Due to an overlap on the World Tour calendar with the Euskal Bira in Spain, defending champion Anna van der Breggen was not be present in this year's event.

Teams
Fifteen teams participated in the race. Each team had a maximum of six riders:

Schedule

Classification leadership table
In the Tour of California, five different jerseys were awarded. For the general classification, calculated by adding each cyclist's finishing times on each stage, and allowing time bonuses for the first three finishers at intermediate sprints and at the finish of mass-start stages, the leader received a yellow jersey. This classification was considered the most important of the 2017 Tour of California, and the winner of the classification was considered the winner of the race.

Additionally, there was a sprints classification, which awarded a green jersey. In the sprints classification, cyclists received points for finishing in the top 10 in a stage. For winning a stage, a rider earned 15 points, with 12 for second, 9 for third, 7 for fourth with a point fewer per place down to a single point for 10th place. Points towards the classification could also be accrued – awarded on a 3–2–1 scale – at intermediate sprint points during each stage; these intermediate sprints also offered bonus seconds towards the general classification. There was also a mountains classification, the leadership of which was marked by a white jersey with red polka dots. In the mountains classification, points were won by reaching the top of a climb before other cyclists, with more points available for the higher-categorised climbs.

The fourth jersey represented the young rider classification, marked by a predominantly "white design" jersey. This was decided in the same way as the general classification, but only riders born after 1 January 1992 were eligible to be ranked in the classification. There was also a classification for teams, in which the times of the best three cyclists per team on each stage were added together; the leading team at the end of the race was the team with the lowest total time. In addition, there was a combativity award given after each stage to the rider considered, by a jury, to have "who best exemplifies the character of those engaged in the fight against cancer / heart disease", in line with the jersey's sponsors. This award was marked by a blue jersey.

External links

References

women
2018 in American sports
2018 in sports in California
2018 UCI Women's World Tour
May 2018 sports events in the United States
Women's sports in California